The Army of Free Lebanon – AFL (| Jayish Lubnan al-Horr) or "Colonel Barakat's Army" (| Jayish Barakat), also designated Armée du Liban Libre (ALL) and Armée du Colonel Barakat in French, was a predominantly Christian splinter faction of the Lebanese Army that came to play a major role in the 1975–77 phase of the Lebanese Civil War.

Emblem
Upon its formation, the AFL adopted as logo a rectangular (or square) red and blue 'flash' with a stylized white Lebanese cedar tree in the middle, which was hastily painted on their armoured and transport vehicles; sometimes the motto 'Free Lebanon' (Arabic: لبنان الحر | Lubnan al-Horr) written in Arabic script was painted alongside the flash on the hull and turret of the tanks. In alternative, a greenish-yellow stencil, bearing the Lebanese Armed Forces (LAF) coat-of-arms was also applied.

Origins
The AFL began to be established on January 23, 1976, in Beirut by Lebanese Colonel Antoine Barakat who declared loyalty to the then President of Lebanon Suleiman Frangieh. A Maronite from Frangieh's hometown Zgharta, Barakat rose with the troops of the Beirut Command (about 700 soldiers) in response for Lieutenant Ahmed Al-Khatib's rebellion two days earlier at the head of the breakaway Lebanese Arab Army (LAA). Another officer, the head of Jounieh garrison Major Fouad Malek, supported the Barakat-led faction, as did Major Saad Haddad the commander of the Marjayoun garrison in southern Lebanon. These three formations where eventually integrated into the "Army of Free Lebanon", whose creation was formally announced on March 13, 1976, by Col. Barakat at the Shukri Ghanem Barracks in the Fayadieh district of East Beirut.

Structure

Field organization
Headquartered at Shukri Ghanem Barracks, a major military facility situated at Fayadieh in the vicinity of the Ministry of Defense complex at Yarze, the AFL numbered some 3,000 uniformed regulars by 1978, mostly Christian Maronites and Greek-Catholics. Like the LAA, the AFL also maintained a flexible structure unlike the old regular Lebanese Armed Forces (LAF), with the bulk of the force comprising some 1,500-2,000 soldiers from different Army units assembled into eight independent mixed combat groups (French: Groupements) of roughly company or battalion size. There was no set hierarchy, and rank and seniority meant little; performance in the field and political motivation propelled young Army officers – mostly Lieutenants – into leadership positions within the AFL combat groups. By February 1978, they were structured as follows:

Group No 11 (French: Groupement numéro 11) – led by Captain Mounir Bejjani;
Group No 12 (French: Groupement numéro 12) – led by Lieutenants Michel Abou Ghanem and Louis Khoury;
Group No 14 (French: Groupement numéro 14) – led by Lt. Makhoul Hakmeh;
Group No 16 (French: Groupement numéro 16) – led by Lieutenants Abdallah Hadchiti and Ghazi Ghattas;
Group No 18 (French: Groupement numéro 18) – led by Maj. Fouad Malek, later replaced by Lt. Wehbeh Katicha;
Galerie Semaan Battalion – a mechanized unit, also led by Lt. Ghazi Ghattas;
A company-sized contingent (subsequently expanded to battalion strength) from the Army Para-commando regiment (Arabic: فوج المغاوير transliteration Fauj al-Maghaweer) led by Captain Samir el-Achkar.

All these units were permantely allocated at Fayadieh, serving under Col. Barakat's direct orders. Outside Beirut, a 200-strong battalion designated the "Akkar Brigade" (Arabic: لواء عكار | Liwa' el-Akkar), led by Lt. Khalil Nader was stationed in the Akkar District of northern Lebanon. A 500-strong battalion under the title "Army of Lebanon" (Arabic: جيش لبنان | Jayish Lubnan) was based at the Raymond el-Hayek Barracks in Sarba, north of Jounieh headed by Maj. Malek, whilst another battalion of 700 men led by Maj. Haddad and designated the "Marjayoun–Qlaiaa Formation" (Arabic: تكوين مرجعيون - قليعة | Takwin Marjayoun – Qlaiaa), was stationed at Marjayoun Barracks.

List of AFL commanders
Colonel Antoine Barakat (AFL commander-in-chief)
Major Fouad Malek
Major Saad Haddad
Captain Samir el-Achkar
Captain Mounir Bejjani
Lieutenant Abdallah Hadchiti
Lieutenant Ghazi Ghattas
Lieutenant Khalil Nader
Lieutenant Michel Abou Ghanem
Lieutenant Louis Khoury
Lieutenant Makhoul Hakmeh
Lieutenant Wehbeh Katicha

Other AFL personnel
Sergeant Aql Hashem

Weapons and equipment
The AFL was equipped largely from stocks drawn from Lebanese Army reserves, with weapons taken directly from Army barracks and depots or channeled via the Christian rightist militias of the Lebanese Front.

Small-arms
AFL infantry units were issued FN FAL and M16A1 assault rifles; FN MAG and M60 light machine guns were used as squad weapons, with heavier Browning M1919A4 .30 Cal and Browning M2HB .50 Cal machine guns being employed as platoon and company weapons. Officers and NCOs received FN P35 and MAB PA-15 pistols. 
Grenade launchers and portable anti-tank weapons consisted of Belgian RL-83 Blindicide, M72 LAW and Soviet RPG-7 anti-tank rocket launchers, whilst crew-served and indirect fire weapons comprised M2 60mm mortars, M30 4.2 inch (106.7mm) mortars and 120-PM-38 (M-1938) 120mm heavy mortars, plus B-10 82mm and M40A1 106mm recoilless rifles.

Armoured and transport vehicles
Each combat group or fraction fielded conventional armour, infantry and artillery sub-units, provided with Panhard AML-90 and 33 Staghound Mk.III armoured cars, AMX-13 and M41A3 Walker Bulldog light tanks, four M42 Duster SPAAGs, plus tracked M113 and wheeled Panhard M3 VTT armored personnel carriers.

For logistical support, Col. Barakat's troops relied on US Willys M38A1 MD jeeps (or its civilian version, the Jeep CJ-5), US M151A2 jeeps, US Kaiser M715 jeeps, Jeep Gladiator J20 pickup trucks, Chevrolet C-10/C-15 Cheyenne light pickup trucks, and British Land-Rover Mk IIA-III light pickups, plus Chevrolet C-50 medium-duty, Dodge F600 medium-duty, Saviem SM8 TRM4000 4x4, Berliet GBC 8KT 6x6, British Bedford RL lorries, Soviet KrAZ 255 6x6, GMC C7500 heavy-duty trucks and US M35A1 and M35A2 2½-ton 6x6 cargo trucks. These liaison and transport vehicles were also employed as gun trucks (a.k.a. technicals) in the direct fire support role on AFL ground operations, armed with heavy machine guns (HMGs), recoilless rifles and anti-aircraft autocannons. Artillery units relied on military trucks and M5A1 artillery tractors to tow its field guns and howitzers.

Artillery
Their artillery formations fielded British QF Mk III 25-Pounder field guns, Soviet M-30 122mm (M-1938) Howitzers and French Mle 1950 BF-50 155mm howitzers. Six British Bofors 40mm L/60 anti-aircraft guns, six Yugoslav Zastava M55 20mm triple-barreled autocannons, Hispano-Suiza HS.661 30mm single-barreled AA autocannons, and 24 Soviet ZU-23-2 23mm twin-barreled AA autocannons were also employed in the direct fire supporting role.

The AFL in the Lebanese civil war 1976-78
Closely allied with the Christian rightist militias of the Lebanese Front, the AFL battled the leftist Lebanese National Movement (LNM) militias, the LAA and the Palestine Liberation Organization (PLO) guerrilla factions at Beirut, but also fought in northern Lebanon. On March 5, 1976, some 200 Christian AFL soldiers led by Lt. Khalil Nader – who entitled themselves the "Lebanese Liberation Army" (LLA), and later became the "Akkar Brigade" – from the Jounieh garrison departed without permission from their commanding Officer to their home towns of Al-Qoubaiyat and Andaket in the Akkar District of Northern Lebanon, which were being threatened by LAA attacks and artillery bombardments.

On March 13 at Beirut, the AFL units from the Shukri Ghanem Barracks in Fayadieh under Col. Barakat clashed with the Officer cadets of the adjoining Military Academy, whose Commander supported Brigadier general Aziz El-Ahdab's failed coup attempt against President Frangieh, despite the fact that some officers from the AFL (Fouad Malek, Wehbeh Katicha, and Ghazi Ghattas) had signed a petition pledging their support to Gen. Ahdab's initiative. Later on March 25, Col. Barakat's troops bolstered the hard-pressed Republican Guard battalion and Marada Brigade militiamen loyal to President Frangieh in defending the Presidential Palace at Baabda from a two-pronged combined LNM-Lebanese Arab Army (LAA) ground assault amid intense shelling, though prior to the attack the President had decamped to the safety of Zouk Mikael, near Jounieh, and later to Kfour in the Keserwan District. They also provided armour and artillery support to the Christian militias on the closing stages of the Battle of the Hotels, during which an artillery barrage fired by a unit under Barakat's command struck the campus of the American University of Beirut at Rue Bliss in the neighboring Ras Beirut district, causing a number of casualties among the students.

On late March–early April 1976 the AFL, aided by the Internal Security Forces (ISF), fought off successfully an attempt by the LAA and the Druze Popular Liberation Forces (PLF) militia to raid their own Headquarters at the Shukri Ghanem Barracks complex in the Fayadieh district of East Beirut. Under the command of Maj. Fouad Malek, AFL units resumed the same roles later in the sieges of the PLO-held Palestinian refugee camps of Jisr el-Basha and Tel al-Zaatar at East Beirut between June and August 1976.

During the Hundred Days' War in early February 1978, the AFL found itself besieged and bombarded by the Syrian Army in their Fayadieh barracks, though they later helped the NLP Tigers and the newly constituted Lebanese Forces' Command in driving the Syrians out from East Beirut.

Disbandment
In March 1977, the newly elected President of Lebanon Elias Sarkis began slowly to reorganize the battered Lebanese Armed Forces (LAF) structure, which had split into four (or six, according to other sources) sectarian factions. The first fraction of the AFL to be re-integrated into the official battle order of the re-organized Lebanese Army in June 1977 was the Jounieh garrison, whose commander Fouad Malek was promoted to colonel and sent to the École de Guerre in Paris, where he deserted in 1978 to become head of the Lebanese Forces (LF) official representation at the French Capital the following year. In March 1978 at Beirut, Col. Barakat handed over the Fayadieh barracks back to the official authorities, thus effectively signalling the disbandment of the AFL and the return of his troops to the LAF structure. Surprisingly, instead of being court-marshalled for insubordination, Antoine Barakat was promoted to brigadier general and appointed as Military Attaché to the Embassy of Lebanon in Washington, D.C., where he retired. Nearly all the remaining AFL combat group commanders' were rapidly re-integrated into the LAF without receiving any punishment or sanction, which enabled them to pursue their military careers unimpeded – Lt. Makhoul Hakmeh eventually rose to the rank of colonel and went to serve with General Michel Aoun as commander of the 10th Airmobile Brigade during the Elimination War in January–October 1990.

One notable exception was Captain Samir el-Achkar and his commando battalion (Arabic: Maghaweer), who contested the re-integration process. Accused on 23 February 1978 by Colonel Sami El-Khatib, the commander of the Arab Deterrent Force (ADF), of being the instigator of the incident that sparked the Hundred Days' War, Capt. el-Achkar refused to be put on trial by a military court on charges of desertion and treason, rebelling a few days later with his troops by establishing the Lebanese Army Revolutionary Command (LARC), another dissident faction of the Lebanese Army closely aligned with the Kataeb Regulatory Forces (KRF) militia led by Bashir Gemayel. The crisis came to an abrupt end on 1 November that year, when the LAF Command ordered a raid by a 300-strong commando detachment from the Counter-sabotage regiment (Arabic: Moukafaha) under the command of Captain Michel Harrouk and Lieutenants Maroun Khreich and Kozhayya Chamoun on the LARC headquarters at Mtaileb in the Matn District, which resulted in the wounding and subsequent death of Capt. Samir el-Achkar, followed by the full re-incorporation of his men into the official Para-commando Regiment's own structure.

A different fate however, awaited the ex-AFL troops of the Marjayoun garrison in the south.  By late 1976, pressure from PLO and LNM-LAA militias finally forced Major Saad Haddad to evacuate the town and withdraw unopposed with his battalion to the village of Qlaiaa, close to the border with Israel.  Here Maj. Haddad and his men placed themselves under the protection of the Israel Defense Forces (IDF), eventually providing the cadre – after merging with local Christian, Shia Muslim and Druze militias, gathered since October 21 into the informal "Army for the Defense of South Lebanon" or ADSL (French: Armée de Défense du Liban-Sud or ADLS) – of the so-called "Free Lebanese Army" (FLA), later to become known as the South Lebanon Army (SLA).

See also
 Battle of the Hotels
 Hundred Days' War
 Internal Security Forces
 Lebanese Armed Forces
 Lebanese Arab Army
 Lebanese Civil War
 Lebanese Front
 Lebanese Forces
 List of weapons of the Lebanese Civil War
 South Lebanon Army
 Tel al-Zaatar massacre
 Vanguard of the Maani Army (Movement of the Druze Jihad)
 4th Infantry Brigade (Lebanon)
 7th Infantry Brigade (Lebanon)
 10th Airmobile Brigade

Notes

References

Alain Menargues, Les Secrets de la guerre du Liban: Du coup d'état de Béchir Gémayel aux massacres des camps palestiniens, Albin Michel, Paris 2004.  (in French)
Beate Hamizrachi, The Emergence of South Lebanon Security Belt, Praeger Publishers Inc., New York 1984. 
Chris McNab, 20th Century Military Uniforms (2nd ed.), Grange Books, Kent 2002. 
Edgar O'Ballance, Civil War in Lebanon, 1975–92, Palgrave Macmillan, London 1998. 
Éric Micheletti and Yves Debay, Liban – dix jours aux cœur des combats, RAIDS magazine n.º41, October 1989 issue.  (in French)
 Farid El-Kazen, The Breakdown of the State in Lebanon 1967-1976, I.B. Tauris, London 2000.  – 
Itamar Rabinovich, The war for Lebanon, 1970-1985, Cornell University Press, Ithaca and London 1989 (revised edition). , 0-8014-9313-7 – 
Joseph A. Kechichian, The Lebanese Army: Capabilities and Challenges in the 1980s, Conflict Quarterly, Winter 1985.
Joseph Hokayem, L'armée libanaise pendant la guerre: un instrument du pouvoir du président de la République (1975-1985), Lulu.com, Beyrouth 2012. , 1291036601 (in French) – 
Moustafa El-Assad, Civil Wars Volume 1: The Gun Trucks, Blue Steel books, Sidon 2008. 
N.R. Jenzen-Jones & Damien Spleeters, Identifying & Tracing the FN Herstal FAL Rifle: Documenting signs of diversion in Syria and beyond, Armament Research Services Pty. Ltd., Australia, August 2015.  – 
Oren Barak, The Lebanese Army – A National institution in a divided society, State University of New York Press, Albany 2009.  – 
Paul Jureidini, R. D. McLaurin, and James Price, Military operations in selected Lebanese built-up areas, 1975-1978, Aberdeen, MD: U.S. Army Human Engineering Laboratory, Aberdeen Proving Ground, Technical Memorandum 11–79, June 1979.
Philipe Naud, La Guerre Civile Libanaise - 1re partie: 1975-1978, Steelmasters Magazine, August–September 2012, pp. 8–16.  
Rex Brynen, Sanctuary and Survival: the PLO in Lebanon, Boulder: Westview Press, 1990.  – 
Robert Fisk, Pity the Nation: Lebanon at War, London: Oxford University Press, (3rd ed. 2001).  – 
Samer Kassis, 30 Years of Military Vehicles in Lebanon, Beirut: Elite Group, 2003. 
Samer Kassis, Véhicules Militaires au Liban/Military Vehicles in Lebanon 1975-1981, Trebia Publishing, Chyah 2012. 
Steven J. Zaloga, Armour of the Middle East Wars 1948-78, Vanguard series 19, Osprey Publishing Ltd, London 1981. 
Thomas Collelo (ed.), Lebanon: a country study, Library of Congress, Federal Research Division, Headquarters, Department of the Army (DA Pam 550–24), Washington D.C., December 1987 (Third edition 1989). –  
Tony Badran (Barry Rubin ed.), Lebanon: Liberation, Conflict, and Crisis, Palgrave Macmillan, London 2010. 
Zachary Sex & Bassel Abi-Chahine, Modern Conflicts 2 – The Lebanese Civil War, From 1975 to 1991 and Beyond, Modern Conflicts Profile Guide Volume II, AK Interactive, 2021. ISBN 8435568306073

Further reading

Denise Ammoun, Histoire du Liban contemporain: Tome 2 1943-1990, Éditions Fayard, Paris 2005.  (in French) – 
 Fawwaz Traboulsi, A History of Modern Lebanon: Second Edition, Pluto Press, London 2012. 
Leila Haoui Zod, William Haoui, temoin et martyr, Mémoire DEA, Faculté d'Histoire, Université Saint Esprit, Kaslik, Liban 2004. (in French)
 Jean Sarkis, Histoire de la guerre du Liban, Presses Universitaires de France - PUF, Paris 1993.  (in French)
 Samir Kassir, La Guerre du Liban: De la dissension nationale au conflit régional, Éditions Karthala/CERMOC, Paris 1994.  (in French)
 Marius Deeb, The Lebanese Civil War, Praeger Publishers Inc., New York 1980. 
 William W. Harris, Faces of Lebanon: Sects, Wars, and Global Extensions, Princeton Series on the Middle East, Markus Wiener Publishers, Princeton 1997. , 1-55876-115-2

External links
Army of Free Lebanon's M42 Duster SPAAG at Tell el-Zaatar, 1976.
Histoire militaire de l'armée libanaise de 1975 à 1990 (in French)
Pre-1975 Lebanese Army vehicles

Factions in the Lebanese Civil War
Lebanese factions allied with Israel
Phoenicianism